Jordan Mageo (born January 6, 1997) is an American Samoan sprinter. She competed at the 2016 Summer Olympics in the women's 100 metres race; her time of 13.72 seconds in the preliminary round did not qualify her for the first round.

References

External links
 

1997 births
Living people
American people of Samoan descent
American Samoan female sprinters
Olympic track and field athletes of American Samoa
Athletes (track and field) at the 2016 Summer Olympics
Olympic female sprinters
21st-century American women